Events from the year 1983 in art.

Events
 Galería OMR commercial contemporary art gallery founded in Mexico City.
 High Museum of Art, designed by Richard Meier, opened in Atlanta, Georgia.
 Australian painter Sidney Nolan settles in Britain at Rodd Court in Herefordshire on the Welsh border near Presteigne.

Awards
 Archibald Prize: Nigel Thomson – Chandler Coventry

Works

 Richard Beyer's Charles Frederic Swigert Jr. Memorial Fountain installed in Oregon Zoo, Portland.
 Completion of the Christo and Jeanne-Claude environmental artwork, Surrounded Islands,  involving eleven islands in Biscayne Bay off Miami being surrounded by 6,500,000 square feet (600,000 m2) of pink fabric.
 Lucian Freud - Large Interior W11 (After Watteau)
 Completion of Richard Hamilton's diptych The Citizen.
 Cast of John Seward Johnson II's painted bronze Allow Me installed in Portland, Oregon.
 Jean Tinguely and Niki de Saint Phalle's kinetic artwork, the Stravinsky Fountain near the Centre Pompidou, Paris.

Exhibitions

Births
Milo Moiré, Swiss performance artist
Jérémie Iordanoff, French abstract artist

Deaths

January to June
 24 February – Roy Krenkel, American illustrator (b.1918).
 3 March – Hergé, Belgian comics writer and artist (b.1907).
 21 May – Kenneth Clark, English author, museum director, broadcaster and art historians (b.1903).
 May 11 – Ernst Thoms, German painter (b. 1896).
 8 June –  Rachel Baes, Belgian painter  (b.1912).

July to December
 14 July – Philip Zec, British editorial cartoonist (b. 1909).
 12 August – Franz Radziwill, German painter (b. 1895).
 18 August – Nikolaus Pevsner, German-born British art historian (b.1902).
 28 October – Otto Messmer, American animator (b.1892).
 5 November – Jean-Marc Reiser, French comics creator (b.1941).
 17 November – John Russell Harper, Canadian art historian (b.1914).
 2 December – Aart van den IJssel, Dutch sculptor (b.1922).
 20 December – Bill Brandt, German-born British photographer and photojournalist (b.1904).
 23 December – Colin Middleton, Irish artist (b.1910).
 25 December – Joan Miró, Spanish painter, sculptor and ceramicist (b.1893).

Full date unknown
 Michael Cardew, English studio potter (b.1901).
 Bernard Lamotte, French illustrator, painter and muralist (b.1903).
 Edward Wesson, English watercolour artist (b.1910).

See also
 1982 in fine arts of the Soviet Union
 1983 in fine arts of the Soviet Union

References

 
Years of the 20th century in art
1980s in art